Jay Alan Sekulow (born June 10, 1956) is an American lawyer, radio, television talk show host and politically conservative media personality. He has been chief counsel of the American Center for Law & Justice (ACLJ) since 1991. As a member of President Donald Trump's legal team, he served as lead outside counsel for Trump's first impeachment trial in the United States Senate.

Sekulow built a legal and media business over a thirty-year period by representing conservative, religious, and anti-abortion groups. He hosts a syndicated radio show and is a frequent guest commentator on the Christian Broadcasting Network and the Fox News Channel television networks.

Early life and education
Jay Alan Sekulow was born in Brooklyn, New York, the son of Natalie (née Wortman) and Stanley Sekulow.

Sekulow was raised on Long Island, in the town of Jericho.  He came from a Jewish family, attended Hebrew School, and had a bar mitzvah.  While in high school Sekulow and his family moved to Atlanta, where he graduated from Lakeside High School, then earned a B.A. in 1977 and a J.D. from Mercer University in 1980. While attending Atlanta Baptist College (now the Atlanta campus of Mercer University), Sekulow became interested in Christianity and converted to Messianic Judaism after encountering Jews for Jesus. Sekulow earned a Ph.D. from Regent University in 2004, writing his dissertation on religious influence on Supreme Court Justices and their opinions.

Career and business ownership
After graduating from law school, Sekulow worked at the Internal Revenue Service (IRS) as a prosecutor with the tax litigation division for "about 18 months." 

In 1982, he opened a law firm in Atlanta, Georgia, with former Mercer classmate Stuart J. Roth which soon evolved into a business buying, renovating, and selling historic properties as a tax shelter for wealthy investors.  IRS regulations changed in the mid-eighties, and the firm collapsed when investors sued the owners for fraud and securities violations. Sekulow and Roth filed for Chapter 7 bankruptcy relief in 1987, with Sekulow listing $13 million in liabilities and $638,000 in assets, and leaving "a trail of angry investors and employees."

In 1987 Sekulow became general counsel for Jews for Jesus. In 1988 he founded the nonprofit group Christian Advocates Serving Evangelism (CASE) whose president he is and whose board members are him, his wife, and their two sons.

In 1992, Sekulow became the director of the ACLJ, where he was chief counsel and principal officer in 2018.  In the early 1990s he also joined the faculty at Regent University Law School.

Sekulow is half-owner of the for-profit professional corporation Constitutional Litigation and Advocacy Group, P.C., incorporated in 2003, whose governor and executive officer is Roth.  From 2011 to 2016, the ACLJ paid the group $23 million, "its largest outside expense."

Sekulow owns Regency Productions, the company that produces his radio show and was paid $11.3 million by the two charities for production services between 2000 and 2017.

Sekulow hosts Jay Sekulow Live!, a syndicated daily radio program broadcast on terrestrial radio, and XM and Sirius satellite radios. This live call-in program focuses on legal and legislative topics. Sekulow is the host of ACLJ This Week, a weekly television news program broadcast on Trinity Broadcasting Network and Daystar.

Counsel to President Trump
Beginning in 2017, Sekulow served as a personal attorney to President Donald Trump during the investigation of Special Counsel Robert Mueller and investigations by Congressional committees into links between Trump associates and Russian officials.

Sekulow also served as lead outside counsel for Trump during his impeachment proceedings in 2019 and 2020. He made several allegedly false statements on the Senate floor during the first Trump impeachment trial. 

Sekulow also represented Trump confidant and Fox News host Sean Hannity during the investigation by the House Select Committee on the January 6 Attack.

Charity finances
In November 2005, Legal Times published an article which alleged that Sekulow "through the ACLJ and a string of interconnected nonprofit and for-profit entities, has built a financial empire that generates millions of dollars a year and supports a lavish lifestyle—complete with multiple homes, chauffeur-driven cars, and a private jet that he once used to ferry Supreme Court Justice Antonin Scalia." In the article, former donors and supporters claimed that Sekulow engaged in a pattern of self-dealing to finance his "high-flying lifestyle." According to a ranking by the American Institute of Philanthropy, a charity watchdog group, Sekulow was the 13th highest paid executive of a charitable organization in the United States.

ACLJ's and CASE's tax returns show that between 1998 and 2011 they paid more than $33 million to Sekulow, members of his family, and businesses owned or co-owned by them; from 2011 to 2015, the two charities paid $5.5 million to Sekulow and members of his family, and $23 million to their businesses. Since 2011, donations to ACLJ are routed through Sekulow's family-run CASE, and many "transactions that benefit members of the Sekulow family are disclosed on the CASE returns, but not the ACLJ's."  Between 2011 and 2015, the ACLJ, the "public face of the two nonprofits," collected nearly $230 million in charitable donations.

On June 27 and 28, 2017,  The Guardian reported that documents obtained by them confirmed later that "millions in donations" were steered to his family members, that Sekulow "approved plans to push poor and jobless people to donate money to his Christian nonprofit, which since 2000 has steered more than $60m to Sekulow, his family and their businesses", and that attorneys general in New York and North Carolina opened investigations of Sekulow's CASE for possibly using pressure tactics in telemarketer calls to raise money which was allegedly misdirected to Sekulow and his family.

News and politics
Sekulow is thought by some in Washington to have been one of the "Four Horsemen" who "engineered" the nomination of Chief Justice John G. Roberts to the Supreme Court. In 2007, Sekulow endorsed Mitt Romney's presidential campaign. He has opposed the building of Park51, an Islamic center in Lower Manhattan two blocks from the World Trade Center.

On February 27, 2019 Michael Cohen reported in testimony before Congress that Jay Sekulow and other members of Trump's legal team made “several” changes to his false statement to the House Intelligence Committee, including a change to the “length of time that the Trump Tower project stayed and remained alive.” Sekulow disputed the testimony "Today’s testimony by Michael Cohen that attorneys for the president edited or changed his statement to Congress to alter the duration of the Trump Tower Moscow negotiations is completely false". The Intelligence Committee announced on May 14, 2019, that it would investigate whether Sekulow “reviewed, shaped and edited” Michael Cohen's false testimony to Congress. The Washington Post reported on May 20, 2019, that Cohen testified in closed session before the Intelligence Committee that Sekulow instructed him to falsely testify that the Trump Tower Moscow discussions ended in January 2016. The Senate Intelligence Committee's August 2020 final report on 2016 election interference noted that after his indictment, Cohen discussed a presidential pardon with Sekulow more than six times, and that "he understood that the pardon discussions had come from Trump through Sekulow."

The New York Times reported in December 2019 that people close to Sekulow said he told them he voted for Hillary Clinton in 2016. In 2020, January, he was named as part of the  counsel team that represented Donald Trump in the impeachment case in the Senate.

Personal life
Sekulow and Pamela McPherson married in 1978 and have two adult sons, Jordan and Logan. Jordan Sekulow is an attorney with the ACLJ and Director of International Operations. He also co-hosts the radio and television programming with his father. Logan briefly starred in the Nickelodeon series U-Pick Live in 2005. 

Sekulow is a Messianic Jew and a convert to Christianity. Sekulow's youngest brother Scott was the founder and Rabbi of the Messianic Jewish Congregation Beth Adonai in Atlanta, Georgia, until his death in August 2021 of Covid-19. 

Sekulow is a member of the Board of Trustees of the Supreme Court Historical Society in Washington, D.C.  He plays drums and guitar in the "Jay Sekulow Band", which includes John Elefante, a former member of the band Kansas, and John W. Schlitt, a former member of Head East and Petra, among its members.

Awards and accomplishments
 In 1994, Sekulow was named to the National Law Journals Power List. 
 In 1997, he was named to The American Lawyers Public Sector 45, a list dedicated to legal public servants who have had the greatest effect in their respective fields.

 Legal Times profiled him as one of the "90 Greatest Washington Lawyers of the Last 30 years".

Publications
1990: From Intimidation to Victory, Creation House 
1993: Knowing Your Rights:  Taking Back Our Religious Liberties
1996: And Nothing But the Truth
1997: Christian Rights in the Workplace, The American Center for Law and Justice
2000: The Christian, The Court, and The Constitution, The American Center for Law and Justice
2005: Witnessing Their Faith: Religious Influence on Supreme Court Justices and Their Opinions, Rowman & Littlefield
2014: Rise of ISIS: A Threat We Can't Ignore (with Jordan Sekulow, Robert W. Ash, and David A. French), Howard Books
2015: Undemocratic: How Unelected, Unaccountable Bureaucrats Are Stealing Your Liberty and Freedom, Howard Books
2016: Unholy Alliance: The Agenda Iran, Russia, and Jihadists Share for Conquering the World
2018: Jerusalem: A Biblical and Historical Case for the Jewish Capital

Cases before the Supreme Court
Sekulow has argued in front of the United States Supreme Court 12 times, specializing in issues of the First Amendment. Sekulow most recently argued before the Supreme Court on November 12, 2008 in Pleasant Grove City v. Summum, case No.07-665. Sekulow represented the city in this case concerning government control over monuments and memorials in government-owned public places, which ended the following February with the Court ruling in the city's favor. On March 2, 2009, the Supreme Court issued a summary disposition in the companion case of Summum v. Duchesne City. The Court vacated the Tenth Circuit opinion and remanding the case for an opinion consistent with Pleasant Grove City v. Summum, 555 U.S. 460 (2009).

Sekulow has submitted several amicus briefs in support of conservative issues. He has submitted amicus briefs in landmark cases such as Hamdi v. Rumsfeld, Rasul v. Bush, Gonzales v. Planned Parenthood, and Hein v. Freedom from Religion Foundation. His amicus briefs for Van Orden v. Perry and Wisconsin Right to Life v. FEC were cited by Justices John Paul Stevens and John Roberts respectively. Sekulow was counsel to Robert and Mary Schindler during the controversy surrounding their daughter, Terri Schiavo. Sekulow's amicus brief in Morse v. Frederick was in support of the ACLU's position; he argued that schools banning "offensive" speech would also be able to prohibit religious speech with which the administrators disagree.

List of Supreme Court cases

See also
Timeline of investigations into Trump and Russia (2017)
Timeline of investigations into Trump and Russia (2019)

References

External links
"The Secrets of Jay Sekulow" Legal Times November 1, 2005
 Oyez Profile

1956 births
Living people
21st-century American businesspeople
21st-century American lawyers
21st-century American male writers
21st-century American non-fiction writers
21st-century Protestants
American people of Polish-Jewish descent
American people of Ukrainian-Jewish descent
American political writers
American Zionists
Christians from Georgia (U.S. state)
Converts to Protestantism from Judaism
Donald Trump litigation
Jewish American writers
Lawyers from New York City
Mercer University alumni
Messianic Jews
Regent University alumni
Washington, D.C., Republicans
Writers from Brooklyn
Writers from Washington, D.C.
American male non-fiction writers
Tennessee Republicans
Members of the defense counsel for the first impeachment trial of Donald Trump